Charles Clark (1878 – 1930) was a Scottish footballer who played in the Football League for Everton, and the Southern League for Plymouth Argyle and Crystal Palace. He was a half back.

Life and career
Clark was born in Thorniewood. He began his career with a club of the same name before joining Hamilton Academical, initially playing as a forward. He was signed by Everton in 1901 and made six league appearances over two seasons, in which he scored one goal.

In 1903, Clark joined Plymouth Argyle and was the club's first choice centre half for the next six years. In his second season with Argyle, he received a Western League winner's medal and made 54 appearances in all competitions, scoring in three of them. Described as "absolutely untiring" and "always a dominating factor in a game", Clark was an extremely popular club captain. He played in excess of 40 matches per season for Argyle until his last.

Clark made his final Plymouth appearance in April 1909, which took his overall tally to 272 in league and cup competition, with nine goals. He left the club later that year and moved to Crystal Palace, where he made 32 appearances in all competitions (31 league appearances) without scoring. Clark retired from playing in 1910.

Honours
Western League First Division: 1904–05

References

1878 births
1930 deaths
Footballers from North Lanarkshire
Scottish footballers
Association football central defenders
Hamilton Academical F.C. players
Everton F.C. players
Plymouth Argyle F.C. players
Crystal Palace F.C. players
Scottish Football League players
English Football League players
Southern Football League players
Western Football League players
Scottish Junior Football Association players